Trump World Tower is a residential condominium building in the Turtle Bay neighborhood of Midtown Manhattan in  New York City. The tower is located at 845 United Nations Plaza, on First Avenue between 47th and 48th Streets. It was developed by Donald Trump and was constructed between 1999 and 2001.

Architecture
Trump World Tower has 376 units. The resulting large windows allow for extensive views of the East River and Midtown Manhattan. The building is constructed with concrete to increase its wind resistance.

History
In 1961, the 18-story United Engineering Center was built on the site. The Center was demolished to make way for the Trump World Tower. In 1997, Donald Trump and his partners, including the Daewoo Corp., a South Korean chaebol, signed a deal to purchase the site from the United Engineering Trustees for $52 million. Trump also acquired unused air rights from at least seven adjacent low-rise properties, specifically two brownstones, the Catholic Holy Family Church and the Japan Society. Demolition began in October 1998.

Prior to construction, many neighbors, including veteran journalist Walter Cronkite, opposed the building due to its height and lack of distinguishing exterior features. Among the concerns was that this tower would dwarf the headquarters of the United Nations across the street, in particular the  United Nations Secretariat Building. East Side neighbors who opposed the project raised $400,000 in a bid to defeat it, with investment manager and philanthropist Alberto Vilar contributing $100,000. Opponents argued that the project would block views, was aesthetically unappealing, violated zoning laws, and was out of character with the surrounding neighborhood. The Municipal Art Society also challenged the project on grounds of air pollution. Opponents lost their battle in state court.

Construction of the building began in 1999. The construction was financed by two German lenders, Deutsche Bank and Bayerische Hypo- und Vereinsbank.

Trump World Tower was briefly the tallest all-residential tower in the world, prior to the completion of the 21st Century Tower in Dubai (2003) and the Tower Palace 3 in Seoul (2004). The tallest of the handful of wholly residential towers completed to date by Donald Trump, it cost approximately US$300 million to construct. The penthouse on the top two floors of the structure which totaled 20,000 square feet (1,858 m²) was priced at $58 million; however, after failing to sell for years, it was split into four different units.

Around 2006, Donald Trump was involved in a struggle with the condominium board at the Trump World Tower. Trump requested the assistance of lawyer Michael Cohen, and Trump gained control of the board.

Occupants
The tower's most expensive floors attracted wealthy buyers from the former Soviet Union. Approximately 65 units were sold to Russian buyers in the late 1990s. New York Yankees star Derek Jeter purchased a 5,425-square-foot condominium for $12.6 million in 2001, and sold it in 2012 for $15.5 million. In 2002, Bill Gates, Harrison Ford, and Sophia Loren were reported to have owned or rented apartments in the building. Trump sold the 45th floor in June 2001 for $4.5 million to the Kingdom of Saudi Arabia, which made the apartments part of its Mission to the United Nations in 2008. George and Kellyanne Conway owned a condominium unit at Trump World Tower during the early 2000s.

Socialite Jocelyn Wildenstein owns a 5,160-square-foot, eight bedroom penthouse in the Tower. In 2015 she listed it for $17.5 million, but it did not sell. In February 2017 she relisted it for $13 million.

The World Bar, a two-story bar and cocktail lounge, is located in the building. It is a popular spot among UN diplomats who work nearby.

In popular culture
The building and some of its condominium units have previously been featured on NBC's The Apprentice, which featured Trump. It has also appeared on the NBC syndicated television show Extra Season 13 - Ep. 193. The building also featured heavily in the 2007 film Before the Devil Knows You're Dead.

The main character of Don Delillo's 2003 novel Cosmopolis holds residence in the top three floors of a building that, while unnamed, is described as the tallest residential tower in New York and located at First Avenue in Midtown Manhattan.

See also
 List of tallest buildings in New York City
 List of things named after Donald Trump

References

External links

 
 
 3D View of World Tower apartment
 CityRealty Trump World Tower

2001 establishments in New York City
Assets owned by the Trump Organization
Donald Trump real estate
Privately owned public spaces
Residential buildings completed in 2001
Residential condominiums in New York City
Residential skyscrapers in Manhattan
Turtle Bay, Manhattan